The HGK guidance kit (HGK), developed by TÜBİTAK-SAGE, is a GPS/INS  guidance kit that converts bombs range from 227 kg (500 pounds) to 907 kg (2000-lb) Mark 80-series munitions into smart bombs. A CAMGÖZ (glass eye) laser seeker, resistant to countermeasures and with over 315 degrees of view angle, again developed by TÜBİTAK-SAGE, provides guidance.

The kit can be used with Mark 84, Mark 83 and Mark 82 bombs.

In pop culture 
H-G-K is the name of a track on the Japanese hard rock band Band-Maid's album Unseen World, which has been confirmed to be referring to the bomb in an interview.

References 

Air-to-surface missiles of Turkey
Aerial bombs
Guided bombs
Military equipment introduced in the 2000s